Batur is a Kazakh title meaning "Hero" and may refer to:

People
Batur (surname)

Places
 Arigh Batur
 Batur, a village in Kintamani, Bali known for the temple Pura Ulun Danu Batur.
 Lake Batur
 Mount Batur
 Batur, Afghanistan

See also
Baghatur

Other
The leader of an Oboq